Antón Escobar Tapias (born 16 June 1998) is a Spanish professional footballer who plays as a forward for Polvorín FC.

Club career
Born in Nigrán, Pontevedra, Galicia, Escobar finished his formation with ED Val Miñor. On 9 August 2017, after spending the pre-season with Segunda División B side Coruxo FC, he signed for CD Choco in Tercera División.

Escobar made his senior debut on 20 August 2017, starting in a 1–1 away draw against CD Cultural Areas. He scored his first goals on 12 October, netting a brace in a 2–2 draw at SD Negreira, and finished the season with ten goals.

On 19 July 2018, Escobar joined CD Lugo on a two-year deal, being initially assigned to the farm team in the fourth division. He made his first team debut on 29 September of the following year, coming on as a late substitute for Christian Herrera in a 1–4 home loss against CD Tenerife in the Segunda División championship.

On 30 January 2020, Escobar was loaned to Segunda División B side Coruxo FC for the remainder of the campaign.

References

External links
 
 
 

1998 births
Living people
Spanish footballers
Footballers from Nigrán
Association football forwards
Segunda División players
Segunda División B players
Tercera División players
Polvorín FC players
CD Lugo players
Coruxo FC players